Kinghorn is a town and parish in Fife, Scotland. A seaside resort with two beaches, Kinghorn Beach and Pettycur Bay, plus a fishing port, it stands on the north shore of the Firth of Forth, opposite Edinburgh. According to the 2008 population estimate, the town has a population of 2,930.

Known as the place where King Alexander III of Scotland died, it lies on the A921 road and the Fife Coastal Path. Kinghorn railway station is on the Edinburgh to Aberdeen and Fife Circle railway lines. Kinghorn only has a primary school, so high school pupils must travel by bus to Balwearie High School in Kirkcaldy.

The town's lifeboat station is one of Scotland's busiest - regularly getting called out to all sorts of emergencies in the Firth. Currently stationed at Kinghorn is an Atlantic 85 inshore lifeboat, B-836 "Tommy Niven".

The civil parish has a population of 4,201 (in 2011).

Burntisland was in the past referred to as Little Kinghorn or Wester Kinghorn.

History
The meaning of the name Kinghorn (or Kingorn , with stress on the latter syllable, as it was pronounced locally until at least the early 20th century) comes .

The historic Royal Burgh of Kinghorn lies on the coast of Fife. The former royal castle at Kinghorn was frequently visited by the Scottish Court in the period of the House of Dunkeld. The King's castle, controlling the seaway, stood on the headland above Pettycur. King Alexander III was returning on horseback to Kinghorn Castle to see his new wife Yolande of Dreux, when he fell and was found dead on the beach of Pettycur Bay in March 1286, creating the succession crisis that led to the Wars of Scottish Independence.

A later structure, Glamis Tower (or Glamis Castle), stood just behind the High Street. When Sir John Lyon married Princess Johanna in 1373, the daughter of King Robert II, her dowry included Glamis Castle. Rebuilt in 1543, the castle was besieged by James Kirkcaldy of Grange in 1546 and fell. Both buildings have totally disappeared and the sites built over in modern times.

During the Scottish Reformation, French troops commanded by Henri Cleutin and Captain Sarlabous sailed from Leith and fought with the Lords of the Congregation at Pettycur Bay on 7 January 1560. Kinghorn Castle remained an important possession of the Scottish Crown, and this was recognised by the creation of the Earldom of Kinghorne in 1606.

In October 1589 the minister of Kinghorn parish, John Scrimgeour, was chosen by King James VI to accompany him on his voyage to meet his bride, Anne of Denmark, in Norway. 

A burn, fed from the freshwater Kinghorn Loch above the town, once provided the town with its water and subsequently provided the source of power to drive the machinery of flax mills.

The old town was dramatically transformed in 1846 by the construction of the railway viaduct across the valley of the burn and the opening of Kinghorn Station by the Edinburgh and Northern Railway which had its terminus at Burntisland for ferries across the Forth to Granton. Much of the former horse ferry traffic from Pettycur Bay was lost to Burntisland. The huge viaduct (mainly solid) splits the original town in two and totally dominates the lower (southern) section.

Following the opening of the Forth Railway Bridge in 1890, the North British Railway started to promote Kinghorn's picturesque sheltered bay and beach as a resort, which led to considerable development of the town.

Buildings of Note

Kinghorn Town Hall by Thomas Hamilton 1830.
Kinghorn Parish Church (1774) with a dramatic tower added in 1895 by Sydney Mitchell
Kinghorn War memorial (1923) designed by William Williamson of Kirkcaldy and sculpted by Alexander Carrick

The town contains a number of 18th-century houses in the Scots vernacular style, but the integrity of the streetscapes are seriously compromised by the "town planning" of the 1960s and 70s, which failed to respect the original character and form.

Ministers
William Gardine Dobie VD, served 1887-1907
Alexander Hannay McIlwraith, served 1908-1926
John Heriot Ballingall, served the Free Church 1845 to 1879

Provosts
John Sim served 1899 to 1908 - manager of Kinghorn Gas Works

Notable people
William Barron Coutts FRSE, military scientist
John McAulay, recipient of the Victoria Cross
Jimmy Frew, footballer 
George Sanders, Scottish portrait painter
Christina Robertson, portrait painter in the UK and Russia
John Scrimgeour, minister put under house arrest for not requiring his congregation to take the knee for Holy Communion
Sharon Small, actress
Professor Neil Campbell, chemist

Education
Kinghorn Primary School is the only school in Kinghorn. The school is housed in a building that was built in 1986. The school has currently achieved three of the four "green flags" available under the Eco-Schools scheme, with the third flag being achieved on 27 May 2009. The school has a long history. The original Parish School building of 1823 designed by Thomas Hamilton is now a library and community centre that retains the original octagonal Museum vestibule with replicas of the Elgin Marbles.

Culture and sport
An annual attraction is the Black Rock '5' Race, commonly referred to as the "Black Rock '5'" or the "Black Rock Race", is a road and beach running race of about  that has been held in Kinghorn each year since 1987. Its distinguishing feature is the loop around the Black Rocks, over a mile from the shore, and largely under water except at low tide. The race is held on a suitable Friday in May or June, when the tide is out and the water is no more than knee deep. Over the years it has changed from a simple race into a full-blown social night in Kinghorn's calendar.

The inaugural Black Rock '5', held in 1987, was won by Gifford Kerr, ahead of 66 other finishers; a very small field by today's standards - in 2005 there were over 600 participants, of a wide variety of abilities. The race has been staged every year since 1987, apart from 1991, and throughout the years the numbers have increased significantly, as did the quality of the top end of the field, with recent winners including Neil Renault and Ross Houston.

In the 21st century the race has been dominated by Edinburgh running club Hunters Bog Trotters (HBT) with both Phil Mowbray and Don Naylor having taken the spoils. The course record belongs to Ian Harkness, also of HBT, in a time of 22:03.

See also 
Kinghorn (Parliament of Scotland constituency)

Notes

References

External links

 Kinghorn lifeboat
 Black Rock race
 Old and new Kinghorn pictures at Fife Family History
 Alexander Carrick, sculptor of the war memorial

 
Seaside resorts in Scotland
Towns in Fife
Parishes in Fife